The Men and the Issues is a Canadian current affairs television miniseries which aired on CBC Television in 1963.

Premise
This miniseries featured interviews with the federal political party leaders prior to the 1963 federal election: Lester B. Pearson, John Diefenbaker, Tommy Douglas and Robert N. Thompson. The interviews were conducted by Clive Baxter, Mark Harrison, Arthur Lower, James McCook and Robert McKenzie.

Scheduling
Half-hour episodes were broadcast on the evenings of 19, 20, 25 and 26 March 1963.

References

External links
 

CBC Television original programming
1963 Canadian television series debuts
1963 Canadian television series endings
1960s Canadian television news shows
Canadian political television series
1960s Canadian television talk shows